U3 or U-3 may refer to:

Transportation
 U3, an underground rapid transit line in many major German/Austrian cities:
 U3 (Berlin U-Bahn)
 U3 (Frankfurt U-Bahn)
 U3 (Hamburg U-Bahn)
 U3 (Munich U-Bahn)
 U3 (Nuremberg U-Bahn)
 U3 (Stuttgart Stadtbahn)
 U3 (Vienna U-Bahn)
 Avies (IATA code: U3), an Estonian airline
 Cessna U-3, the military model of the Cessna 310 aircraft
 German submarine U-3, one of several German submarines
 Boeing Customer Code for Garuda Indonesia

Computer technology
 U3 (software), a design specification for USB storage, created by U3, LLC
 U3, a speed class for Secure Digital (SD) cards
 U.3, an improvement to the U.2 storage interface standard

Video games
 Ultima III: Exodus, a 1983 video game
 Uncharted 3: Drake's Deception, a 2011 video game

Other
 U3, an unemployment figure released by the United States Bureau of Labor Statistics
 Small nucleolar RNA U3, a type of non-coding RNA